Murchison Promontory, a cape (promontory) in the northern Canadian Arctic, is the northernmost mainland point of the Americas and of Canada. Located  from the North Pole, it is  farther north than Point Barrow, Alaska, the northernmost point of all U.S. territory.

Geography

Murchison Promontory extends along the northern edge of the Boothia Peninsula, at right angles to the Bellot Strait, which separates it from Somerset Island.

History
The area was first explored in April 1852 by the Canadian Captain William Kennedy and the French explorer Joseph René Bellot while searching for traces of John Franklin's lost Arctic expedition. The strait was then named after Bellot, who drowned the following year.

Irish-born Francis Leopold McClintock also wintered in the area with his ship Fox in the winter of 1858-1859 in his search for the Franklin expedition. In July 1859, McClintock named the promontory, which his expedition determined to be the northernmost point of the mainland, after Royal Geographical Society president Roderick Murchison. Murchison was a prominent supporter of Jane Franklin in her efforts towards a continued search for her husband, which included the sponsorship of McClintock's expedition.

In 1937 Scot E. J. "Scotty" Gall passed the promontory on his ship Aklavik on the first crossing of the Bellot Strait, travelling from the western shore to the eastern for the Hudson's Bay Company.

References

External links
 About Murchison Promontory
 Map of Murchison Promontory
 Image of Murchison Promontory

Peninsulas of Kitikmeot Region
Extreme points of Earth